Queijadinha is a custard tart which originated in Brazil. There are many types of "queijadinhas", but the traditional one is prepared with these main ingredients: grated coconut and cheese, sweetened condensed milk, sugar, butter and egg yolks. Queijadinhas are very common in bakeries and children's parties. 

Queijada de Sintra is a type of queijada pastry made in Sintra, Portugal.

See also
 Queijada - a similar Portuguese sweet
 Cocada - another coconut-based confection popular in Latin America
 List of Brazilian sweets and desserts

References

Brazilian desserts
Cheese dishes
Foods containing coconut
Milk dishes
Portuguese confectionery
Custard desserts
Tarts